James Gilmore Backus (February 25, 1913 – July 3, 1989) was an American actor. Among his most famous roles were  Thurston Howell III on the 1960s sitcom Gilligan's Island, the father of James Dean's character in Rebel Without a Cause, the voice of the nearsighted cartoon character Mr. Magoo, the rich Hubert Updike III on the radio version of The Alan Young Show, and Joan Davis' character's husband (a domestic court judge) on TV's I Married Joan. He also starred in his own show of one season, The Jim Backus Show, also known as Hot Off the Wire.

An avid golfer, Backus made the 36-hole cut at the 1964 Bing Crosby Pro-Am tournament. He was inducted to the Hollywood Walk of Fame in 1960.

Early life
 
Backus was born February 25, 1913, in Cleveland, Ohio, and raised in Bratenahl, Ohio, an East Side suburb of Cleveland located on the Lake Erie shore, surrounded by the city on three sides. He was the son of Russell Gould Backus and Daisy Taylor (née Gilmore) Backus. He attended Shaw High School in East Cleveland, Ohio and graduated from University School in Hunting Valley, Ohio.

Career

Acting

Backus was acting on radio as early as 1940, playing the role of millionaire aviator Dexter Hayes on Society Girl on CBS.
He had an extensive career and worked steadily in Hollywood over five decades, often portraying characters with an "upper-crust", New England-like air, much like his best-known role, Thurston Howell III on Gilligan's Island. He appeared in (and narrated) A Dangerous Profession (1949); Deadline – U.S.A. (1951) with Humphrey Bogart; Pat and Mike (1952) with Spencer Tracy and Katharine Hepburn; Rebel Without a Cause (1955); The Pied Piper of Hamelin (1957); and It's a Mad, Mad, Mad, Mad World (1963). He also made television appearances on The Beverly Hillbillies (1962).

Backus was the voice of the nearsighted cartoon character Mr. Magoo. Years later, when Backus was a frequent talk show guest, he would recount the time Marilyn Monroe urgently beckoned him into her dressing room. Henny Backus, Jim's wife, recalled the story: "Jim was in the 1952 film Don't Bother to Knock, with Marilyn Monroe. He came home one night during the filming and told me that Miss Monroe in her most seductive breathy voice asked him to meet her in her dressing room. His curiosity got the better of him and he went. Once there, she exclaimed like an excited child, 'Do Mr. Magoo!' And Jim did."

He frequently could be heard on primetime radio programs in the postwar era, including The Jack Benny Program, and he portrayed an exceedingly vain character named Hartley Benson on The Judy Canova Show on the CBS Radio Network, as well as a similar character named Hubert Updike on The Alan Young Show on the NBC Radio Network. He also starred on the short-lived variety program The Jim Backus Show on the ABC Radio Network in 1957 and 1958, when that network changed its name to the American Broadcasting Network (ABN) and tried out a "Live and Lively" format of "Big Time Radio" with orchestras and audiences. Backus costarred in the comedy show I Married Joan from 1952 to 1955, portraying the husband of Joan Davis.

In stark contrast to his usual affluent characters, he guest-starred on The Brady Bunch as an old gold prospector, a role he also played on a Gilligan's Island episode. He also had a role in the final season episode "The Hustler" in which he plays Mike's boss, Mr. Matthews.

Backus appeared on Gilligan's Island for all three seasons of its run, 1964 to 1967, and later in reunion TV films made between 1978 and 1981. By the third and final film, The Harlem Globetrotters on Gilligan's Island, Backus was suffering from Parkinson's disease and his participation was limited to a cameo appearance. Backus also returned as the voice of Mr. Magoo in various revivals between 1964 and 1977, which included The Famous Adventures of Mr. Magoo and What's New, Mr. Magoo?.

Backus played Reverend Sims in the 1975 "Brides and Grooms" episode of Gunsmoke. He also appeared in "Never Con a Killer" (1977), the pilot for the ABC crime drama The Feather and Father Gang. In 1981, he and his wife Henny appeared in an episode of The Love Boat. In it, he had one line in his four scenes.

Writing and recording

Backus and his wife, Henny Backus, co-wrote several humorous books, including: ...Only When I Laugh, his autobiography, Backus Strikes Back, a memoir, Forgive Us Our Digressions: An Autobiography, and What Are You Doing After the Orgy? — the title taken from a line Backus spoke in the 1965 film John Goldfarb, Please Come Home!  He also co-wrote the 1971 family film Mooch Goes to Hollywood, about a dog that tries to become a movie star. 

In the late 1950s, he made two novelty 45 rpm records, "Delicious" and "Cave Man". In 1974, a full-length comedy LP album was released on the Doré label under the title The Dirty Old Man, with sketches written by Bob Hudson and Ron Landry, who also appear on the album, along with voice-actress Jane Webb. Backus also played the voice of God in the recording of Truth of Truths, a 1971 rock opera based on the Bible.

Television commercials 
Backus acted in several television commercials. As Mr. Magoo, he also helped advertise the General Electric line of products over the years. In Bowl 'Em Over with GE Bulbs (1963), a Cinécraft Productions sales training film made for the GE Large Lamp Division, Backus introduces the Mr. Magoo Soft White light bulb TV advertising campaign for Fall 1963. For the first time, General Electric commercials would be shown in color on prime-time TV shows, including the Tonight Show with Johnny Carson. He was also spokesman for La-Z-Boy furniture during the 1970s. 

In the late 1980s, he was reunited with former co-star Natalie Schafer in an advertisement for Orville Redenbacher's popcorn. They reprised their roles from Gilligan's Island, but instead of still being shipwrecked, the setting was a luxurious study or den. This would be the final TV appearance for both actors, who were in frail health. They also both appeared on Fox's short lived talk show The Late Show with Ross Shafer, along with the rest of the cast of Gilligan's Island, in 1988.

Death 
On July 3, 1989, Backus died in Los Angeles from complications of pneumonia after suffering from Parkinson's disease for many years.

Discography
Magoo in Hi-Fi (RCA Victor, 1957) as Mr. Magoo
Delicious! (Jubilee, 1958)
Cave Man (Jubilee, 1958)
Truth of Truths (Oak, 1971) as God
The Dirty Old Man (Doré, 1974)
Mr. Magoo's A Christmas Carol (Wonderwall, 1979) as Mr. Magoo

Filmography

Film

Television

References

External links

 
 
 
 
 
 
 
 Literature on Jim Backus

1913 births
1989 deaths
Male actors from Cleveland
American male film actors
American male radio actors
American male stage actors
American male screenwriters
American male television actors
American male voice actors
Columbia Pictures contract players
Deaths from pneumonia in California
People with Parkinson's disease
American Academy of Dramatic Arts alumni
University School alumni
20th-century American male actors
People from Bratenahl, Ohio
Screenwriters from Ohio
20th-century American male writers
20th-century American screenwriters
Warner Bros. Cartoons voice actors